The 1995 CFL Draft composed of seven rounds and 55 Canadian football players that were chosen from eligible Canadian universities as well as Canadian players playing in the NCAA. The first eight picks of the draft were part of a "bonus round" awarded to teams who had complied with the Competitive Expenditure Cap. The following round, consisting of picks 9–16, was the regular first round of the draft.

Bonus round

Round one

Round two

Round three

Round four

Round five

Round six

External links 
 

Canadian College Draft
Cfl Draft, 1995